Thomas Galbraith (15 January 1875 – after 1899) was a Scottish professional footballer who played as a winger for Sunderland.

References

1875 births
Scottish footballers
Association football wingers
Renton F.C. players
Vale of Leven F.C. players
Leicester City F.C. players
Sunderland A.F.C. players
English Football League players
People from Bonhill
Footballers from West Dunbartonshire
Year of death missing